Lower Greenville is a community in the Canadian province of Nova Scotia, located in  Cumberland County.

References
Lower Greenville on Destination Nova Scotia

Communities in Cumberland County, Nova Scotia
General Service Areas in Nova Scotia